Thesprotia pellucida, the grass mantis, is a species of mantis found in Brazil.

References

pellucida
Insects of Brazil
Insects described in 1915